Joel James (born January 22, 1994) is an American professional basketball player for Parma Basket of the VTB United League. In 2018 he began doing basketball color commentary for the ACC Network.

James played 4 years at the University of North Carolina at Chapel Hill, where he averaged 8.8 minutes, 2.2 points and  2.3 rebounds per game. Though not a leading scorer, his personality and antics were popular among viewers and students. He is married to former UNC Softball player Aquilla Mateen.

Career statistics

College

|-
| style="text-align:left;"| 2012–13
| style="text-align:left;"| North Carolina
| 30 || 3 || 9.4 || .509 || - || .563 || 2.4 || .2  || .2  || .3  || 2.2
|-
| style="text-align:left;"| 2013–14
| style="text-align:left;"| North Carolina
| 30 || 13 || 7.9 || .388 || -|| .778 || 2.7 || .2 || .1 || .1 || 1.7
|-
| style="text-align:left;"| 2014–15
| style="text-align:left;"| North Carolina
| 38 || 3 || 10.1 || .451 ||  - || .667 || 1.9 || .2  || .1 || .2 || 2.5 
|-
| style="text-align:left;"| 2015–16
| style="text-align:left;"| North Carolina
| 37 || 10 || 7.8 || .435 || - || .522 || 2.3 || 0 || 0 || .2 || 2.2
|- class="sortbottom"
| style="text-align:center;" colspan="2"| Career
| 135 || 29 || 8.8 || .452 || - || .627 || 2.3 || .1 || .1 || .2 || 2.2

Source:

References

External links
North Carolina Tar Heels bio
RealGM profile

1994 births
Living people
American expatriate basketball people in Japan
American expatriate basketball people in Mexico
American men's basketball players
Basketball players from Florida
Capitanes de Ciudad de México players
Centers (basketball)
Kumamoto Volters players
North Carolina Tar Heels men's basketball players
Parma Basket players
Rayos de Hermosillo players
Sportspeople from West Palm Beach, Florida
Tokyo Hachioji Bee Trains players